Bill Russell (1934–2022) was an American basketball player and coach.

Bill or Billy Russell may also refer to:

Entertainment
Bill Russell (composer) (1905–1992), American music historian and modernist composer
Bill Russell (lyricist) (born 1949), American librettist and lyricist
Billy Russell (comedian) (1893–1971), English comedian and actor
Bill Russell (illustrator), Canadian-American illustrator

Sports
Bill Russell (pitcher) (fl. 1944), American baseball player
Bill Russell (shortstop) (born 1948), American baseball player and manager
Billy Russell (footballer, born 1935), English amateur international footballer
Billy Russell (footballer, born 1959), Scottish footballer and manager

See also
William Russell (disambiguation)